The 2008 Arkansas Razorbacks football team represented the University of Arkansas in the 2008 football season. The Razorbacks played five home games at Donald W. Reynolds Razorback Stadium in Fayetteville, Arkansas and one home game at War Memorial Stadium in Little Rock, Arkansas. The Razorbacks finished the season with an overall record of 5–7 and a conference record of 2–6 in Bobby Petrino's inaugural season.

Leading into the 2008 season

Coaching change

Following the final game of the 2007 season, head coach Houston Nutt resigned from his position at Arkansas. He would later accept the head coaching position at Arkansas's division rival, the Ole Miss Rebels.

After Houston Nutt's resignation, former Louisville Cardinals' and Atlanta Falcons' head coach Bobby Petrino was hired to be the new head coach of the Razorbacks. Petrino's contract with Arkansas is a five-year deal worth $2.85 million per year in annual compensation.

Petrino hired Bobby Allen (defensive tackles), Kirk Botkin (defensive ends and special teams coordinator), Dean Campbell (director of high school relations), Tim Horton (running backs, tight ends and recruiting coordinator), Reggie Johnson (linebackers), Chip Long (graduate assistant), Garrick McGee (quarterbacks), Paul Petrino (offensive coordinator), Mark Robinson (director of football operations), Courtney Sanders (graduate assistant), Mike Summers (offensive line), Jason Veltkamp (strength and conditioning), and Lorenzo Ward (secondary). Ellis Johnson was originally hired to be the defensive coordinator; however, Johnson resigned from his post to take a job with the South Carolina Gamecocks on January 24, 2008. On February 6, 2008, Petrino hired former St. Louis Rams' secondary coach Willy Robinson as defensive coordinator.

Players
Arkansas will return with seven starters on offense and four starters on defense. Returnees on offense include quarterback Casey Dick, who threw for 1,695 yards and 18 touchdowns in the 2007 season, and 2007 Dave Rimington Trophy winner Jonathan Luigs. Three players were named to the Southeastern Conference's Pre-Season All-SEC Team: Jonathan Luigs, Mitch Petrus, and Antwain Robinson.

Departures
The University of Arkansas graduated 11 starting seniors in 2007, which included All-SEC offensive tackle Robert Felton, offensive tackle Nate Garner, fullback Peyton Hillis, wide receiver Robert Johnson, wide receiver Marcus Monk, defensive tackle Marcus Harrison, linebacker Weston Dacus, cornerback Michael Grant, cornerback Matterral Richardson, strong safety Matt Hewitt, and free safety Kevin Woods.

Arkansas also lost consensus All-American tailback Darren McFadden, All-American tailback Felix Jones, and wide receiver Sean Penix as they decided to skip their senior season and declare for the 2008 NFL Draft. The team also lost three quarterbacks in the off-season. Brian Reader stated he would transfer to Monterey Peninsula College, Nathan Emert left the team to pursue a career as a minister, and Clark Irwin left the team to pursue a career in finance and real estate. Placekicker Brian Vavra also decided to leave the team to pursue other opportunities.  Citing lack of playing time, fullback Hezekiah Smith transferred to in-state UAPB.  After spring training began, redshirt freshman linebacker Tim Dial announced that he was leaving the team to transfer to East Central University.

The Razorbacks also lost linebacker Freddie Fairchild when he was dismissed from the team on June 11, 2008.

Transfers
In January 2008, former five-star quarterback recruit Ryan Mallett transferred from Michigan to Arkansas. Due to NCAA transfer rules, Mallett would redshirt his sophomore year and would be able to compete in the 2009 season; however, he would be allowed on the scout team in the 2008 season.

Recruits
On National Signing Day, February 6, 2008, Arkansas received 25 letters of intent by the following players listed below:

Regular season

Schedule

Personnel

Coaching staff

Roster

Game summaries

Western Illinois

The game was played at Donald W. Reynolds Razorback Stadium and marked the first meeting between the two programs. The game started with a Taylor Rowan field goal to give the Leathernecks a 3–0 advantage. Joe Adams of Arkansas pulled in a 10-yard pass from Casey Dick with six minutes remaining in the second quarter. WIU's Herb Donaldson then scored twice, once before halftime, and once after. Dick followed with a 23-yard TD scamper, cutting it to a 17–14 WIU lead. Leatherneck fullback Javid Milton ran the ball from one yard out to give Western Illinois a 24–14 lead. Freshman receiver Greg Childs then caught a Dick aerial at the 7:58 mark in the fourth quarter, with Dick running in the game winning score with only 1:49 remaining.

Western Illinois was ranked 22nd in the Football Championship Subdivision entering the contest.

Louisiana–Monroe

Arkansas is undefeated in the series, with the last game against the Warhawks in 2006, when Arkansas defeated Louisiana–Monroe 44–10. The 2008 game was played at War Memorial Stadium and marked the 8th time the two programs have played each other.
Michael Smith began the scoring with a 13-yard run to paydirt for the Hogs, but Alex Tejada missed the extra point, giving the Hogs only a 6–0 lead. The Warhawks responded with a one-yard pass from fifth-year senior QB Kinsmon Lancaster to Anthony McCall, and Jeremy Gener added a 20-yard field goal to give Monroe a 10–6 lead. Lancaster again hit McCall in the third quarter, this time from 33 yards away, and Gary Fraizer added another Warhawk score to open up a 24–6 advantage over the Razorbacks. The Razorbacks responded with an eight-yard strike to DJ Williams from Casey Dick. The two hooked up again for a two-point conversion, cutting the Warhawk advantage to 24–14. Gener added a field goal with 12:56 remaining in the fourth quarter, but Smith would score again, this time followed by a Shay Haddock completed extra point, cutting the deficit to six. Williams caught a touchdown with eighty-two seconds left, and Haddock connected on the game winning extra point. Lancaster would set Gener up with a game-winning opportunity, but he missed the 45-yard attempt right.

Alabama

Arkansas entered SEC play at home against the Alabama Crimson Tide, as a 9-point underdog. Alabama received the opening kickoff and scored first on their opening drive. The opening drive was helped by a roughing the kicker penalty against Arkansas allowing Alabama to retain possession. Arkansas put together a drive out to midfield on their first drive of the game, but were forced to punt. On the first play of their next drive, Alabama running back Glen Coffee ran 87 yards on the first play for Alabama's second touchdown. At the end of the first quarter, Alabama defensive back Javier Arenas intercepted Casey Dick and returned it 31 yards for a touchdown to put Alabama up 21–0. Arkansas started their next drive at their own 47 yard line after a 41-yard kickoff return by Dennis Johnson, and drove 53 yards for a touchdown on fourth down and 1 from the Alabama 12 yard line. Alabama responded with a 68-yard touchdown drive, capped off by a 25-yard touchdown pass from John Parker Wilson to Julio Jones. On Arkansas's next possession, Alabama corner Justin Woodall intercepted Casey Dick at the Alabama 26 yard line and returned it 74 yards for a touchdown. Arkansas would put together another solid drive, but facing a first and goal at the Alabama one yard line, Alabama stopped Arkansas on 4 plays for a goal line stand. At the half, Alabama was up 35–7.

Arkansas received the second half kickoff and Alabama's Marquis Johnson intercepted Casey Dick's pass on the first play of the second half, setting up a 31-yard touchdown run by Glen Coffee. By the end of the 3rd quarter, both teams had put in their substitutes. On Alabama's first possession of the fourth quarter, backup quarterback Greg McElroy's pass was intercepted by Ramon Broadway, setting up a 10-yard touchdown pass by Arkansas second-string quarterback Tyler Wilson. But on the first play of Alabama's next drive, running back Roy Upchurch ran 62 yards for Alabama's final touchdown. The final score was 49–14, the largest margin of victory in the series since Arkansas beat Alabama 42–6 in 1998.

Texas

One of the biggest match-ups between Arkansas and Texas was the 1969 Game of the Century, which pitted #1 Texas and #2 Arkansas in Fayetteville to determine the national championship; Texas won 15–14. In the most recent match-up between the two programs, the Longhorns achieved a 22–20 win against an unranked Arkansas team. The two schools were once conference foes in the Southwest Conference and Texas leads the series 55–21–0. The 2008 game was scheduled to be played on September 13, 2008, but the potential severe weather from Hurricane Ike postponed the game. The game was rescheduled and was played in Darrell K Royal–Texas Memorial Stadium on September 27, 2008.

Hunter Lawrence of Texas began the scoring with a 34-yard field goal. This was followed by an eight-yard Colt McCoy pass to Jordan Shipley resulting in a touchdown. With a 10–0 lead, Cody Johnson scored for the Longhorns, giving a 17–0 cushion. Arkansas kicker Shay Haddock connected on a 30-yard boot, but McCoy ran for two more touchdowns, of five and thirty-five yards respectively, before halftime. After halftime, Texas continued to roll, with McCoy TD passes to Quan Cosby and Shipley. Aaron Williams returned an interception eighty-one yards for another Texas score, prompting Arkansas' lone touchdown, an eighty-yard fumble return by defensive end Antwain Robinson with 2:20 in response.

The win gave Texas the largest margin of victory in the rivalry since the 1916 edition, a 52–0 drubbing at Clark Field.

Florida

The two programs last played each other in the 2006 SEC Championship Game where #4 Florida defeated #8 Arkansas 38–28. The game was played at Donald W. Reynolds Razorback Stadium and marked the eighth time the two programs have played each other, with Florida leading the series 7–1–0. The game's scoring began with Florida standout QB Tim Tebow's shovel pass to Brandon James for a touchdown. After both teams punted, Florida punted to Michael Smith of Arkansas, who fumbled, giving the Gators the ball. Jeffery Demps scored from 36 yards out to make it a 14–0 Florida advantage. Arkansas had a chance to score before halftime, but the Casey Dick pass was intercepted at the goalline. Gator kicker Jonathan Phillips hit a field goal from 37 yards out to push the UF edge to 17–0. Michael Smith and the Hogs responded with a drive that ended with a Smith rushing touchdown of six yards to cut the deficit to 17–7. Tebow then threw his first interception of the year to redshirt freshman Jerry Franklin, but the Hogs could not capitalize. Florida went on a scoring tear, first with Tebow throwing a 21-yard touchdown to Percy Harvin, followed by Chris Rainey's 75-yard rushing score and Demps' score of 48 yards. Dick passed Joe Ferguson on the school's all-time passing list to become seventh all-time in the fourth quarter.

Auburn

In the 2007 contest, Wes Byrum kicked his second game-winning field goal giving #25 Auburn a 9–7 victory. The 2008 game was played at Jordan–Hare Stadium and marked the 18th time the two programs have played each other with Auburn leading the series 10–7–1. Three days prior to the contest, Auburn fired offensive coordinator Tony Franklin, a proponent of the spread offense.

In Arkansas' fourth-straight AP Top 25 game (all four opponents were in the top 10 when the trip began), the Hogs finally prevailed, 25–22, giving head Hog Bobby Petrino his first SEC victory. The Razorbacks began the scoring, a Shay Haddock field goal with 6:46 remaining in the first quarter. On the ensuing Tiger possession, Tristan Davis returned the kickoff 97 yards for a touchdown, giving a 7–3 lead to Auburn. The second quarter began with a Wes Byrum field goal before the Razorbacks pieced together a touchdown drive, culminating in a one-yard Casey Dick rush. It appeared that the teams would enter halftime tied at 10, but a pass was deflected into the hands of an Auburn receiver, who set up another Byrum field goal to give the Tigers a 13–10 edge at the half. One part of the Tiger's QB carousel, Kodi Burns, a Ft. Smith native, scored from two yards out, giving Auburn a 20–10 lead in the third quarter. Arkansas responded with a reverse pass from true freshman receiver Joe Adams to Casey Dick, but the Haddock extra point was blocked, giving Auburn a four-point lead. The Hogs added a Haddock field goal to start the fourth quarter, cutting the lead to 20–19, before Smith broke free and outran Auburn defenders 63 yards for the longest rushing touchdown of the season. Up five points, Arkansas punter Jeremy Davis ran out of the endzone for an intentional safety, cutting the lead to 3. Burns threw three incompletions, and on fourth down was intercepted by Matt Hewitt, sealing the victory for Arkansas.

Kentucky

Arkansas' last met Kentucky in the 2007 contest in Fayetteville, Arkansas, which resulted in a 42–29 victory for #23 Kentucky when Andre Woodson led the team to a second half comeback against Arkansas. The 2008 game was played at Commonwealth Stadium and marked the 6th time the two programs have played each other with Kentucky leading the series 3–2–0.

Ole Miss

In the 2007 contest, Arkansas defeated Ole Miss 44–7. The 2008 game was played at Donald W. Reynolds Razorback Stadium and marked the 55th time the two programs have played each other with Arkansas leading the series 29–24–1.

Tulsa

The 2008 game against Tulsa was Arkansas' homecoming game and was played at Donald W. Reynolds Razorback Stadium. This marked the 71st time the two programs have played each other with Arkansas leading the series 51–16–3.

South Carolina

In the 2007 contest, Arkansas defeated South Carolina 48–36 as South Carolina gave up 542 rushing yards. The 2008 game was played at Williams-Brice Stadium and marked the 17th time the two programs have played each other with Arkansas leading the series 10–6–0.

Mississippi State

In the 2007 contest, Casey Dick threw a career-high four touchdowns passes that allowed Arkansas to defeat Mississippi State 45–31. The 2008 game was played at Davis Wade Stadium and marked the 19th time the two programs have played each other with Arkansas leading the series 12–5–1.

LSU

The defending national champions LSU Tigers sought to reclaim the Golden Boot after losing it at Death Valley when unranked Arkansas beat then #1 LSU 50–48 in triple overtime. The 2008 game was originally scheduled to be played on November 29, 2008 but was moved to November 28, 2008 to accommodate a national broadcast by CBS Sports. The game was played at War Memorial Stadium and marked the 13th time the two teams play for the Golden Boot. The game also marked the 54th time the two programs have played each other with LSU leading the series 33–18–2.  The outcome of the game was decided by a touchdown pass by quarterback Casey Dick to receiver London Crawford in the last twenty seconds of the game to tie the game.  A successful extra point kick gave the Razorbacks a one-point lead which LSU failed to overcome in the remaining seconds, thus allowing Arkansas to retain possession of the Golden Boot for another year.

Statistics

Team

Scores by quarter

Offense

Rushing

Passing

Receiving

Defense

Special teams

Footnotes
 The University of Arkansas officially play one home game at War Memorial Stadium despite playing there two times. Under the agreement with the University of Louisiana at Monroe, the game at Little Rock, Arkansas against the Warhawks would be considered a home game for the Warhawks and the attendance count was used for their figures.

References

Arkansas
Arkansas Razorbacks football seasons
Arkansas Razorbacks football